Leymus triticoides, with the common names creeping wild rye and beardless wild rye, is a species of wild rye. It is native to western North America from British Columbia to California and Texas.

Habitat
Leymus triticoides often grows in moist habitat, sometimes with heavy and saline soils. It forms a solid root system which allows it to grow at water's edge and prevent the soil from eroding.

Description
This rhizomatous, turf-forming perennial grass reaches 1.3 meters in maximum height. The stiff, slender green to blue-green leaves stand away from the stems at an obvious angle. The inflorescence is a narrow spike of flowers up to 20 centimeters long.

This is a good rangeland grass for grazing, and it is used to stabilize waterways because of its soil-retaining rhizome network.

Leymus triticoides is an important native plant in California chaparral and woodlands habitat restoration projects.

See also
Native grasses of California

References

External links
Jepson Manual Treatment - Leymus triticoides
USDA Plants Profile: Leymus triticoides
Leymus triticoides - Photo gallery

triticoides
Grasses of Canada
Grasses of Mexico
Grasses of the United States
Native grasses of California
Native grasses of Texas
Flora of Arizona
Flora of Nevada
Flora of New Mexico
Flora of Northeastern Mexico
Flora of Northwestern Mexico
Flora of Oregon
Flora of Washington (state)
Flora of the Cascade Range
Flora of the Great Basin
Flora of the Klamath Mountains
Flora of the Sierra Nevada (United States)
Natural history of the California chaparral and woodlands
Natural history of the California Coast Ranges
Natural history of the Central Valley (California)
Natural history of the Channel Islands of California
Natural history of the Peninsular Ranges
Natural history of the San Francisco Bay Area
Natural history of the Santa Monica Mountains
Natural history of the Transverse Ranges
Flora without expected TNC conservation status